American singer RuPaul has released fourteen studio albums, four soundtrack albums, six compilation albums, five remix albums, and four extended plays. RuPaul has also released 68 singles, forty-two music videos and thirteen promotional singles.

RuPaul reached commercial success in the United States with his debut album, Supermodel of the World, which reached number 109 on the US Billboard 200. The album contained RuPaul's signature song, "Supermodel (You Better Work)". The song reached number 45 on the Billboard Hot 100 and was a Top 5 single on the Hot Dance Club Play chart in 1993. Since then, RuPaul has released seven more studio albums, although none featured a single that charted as high as "Supermodel (You Better Work)". In 2014, coinciding with the release of season six of his show RuPaul's Drag Race, his album Born Naked reached number 85 on Billboard 200, making it his current highest-charting album.

Albums

Studio albums

Soundtrack albums

Compilation albums

Remix albums

Extended plays

Singles

As lead artist

Promotional singles

Featured singles

Guest appearances

Music videos

As lead artist

As featured performer

Notes

References

Discographies of American artists
Pop music discographies
Discography
Drag (clothing)-related lists